EPOY may refer to:
Environmental Photographer of the Year award, UK-based award from CIWEM
Enlisted Person of the Year Ribbon, award of the United States Coastguard Service